Jock Bilger (born 25 November 1936) is a New Zealand sailor. He competed at the 1972 Summer Olympics and the 1976 Summer Olympics.

References

External links
 

1936 births
Living people
New Zealand male sailors (sport)
Olympic sailors of New Zealand
Sailors at the 1972 Summer Olympics – Flying Dutchman
Sailors at the 1976 Summer Olympics – Flying Dutchman
People from Rustenburg